The Zolotushinsky mine is a large copper mine located in the south of Russia in Altai Krai. Zolotushinsky represents one of the largest copper reserve in Russia and in the world having estimated reserves of 148.5 million tonnes of ore grading 0.79% copper.

See also 
 List of mines in Russia

References 

Copper mines in Russia